The 1764 Woldegk tornado was one of the strongest tornadoes ever documented in history, receiving the only ever T11 rating on the TORRO scale along with an F5 rating on the Fujita scale and had winds estimated to be >. Most of the information known about this tornado came from a 77-paragraph detailed study by German scientist Gottlob Burchard Genzmer, which was published one year after the tornado occurred. The storm which produced the violent tornado was extremely dry, with almost no rain reported. That said, large hail, reportedly reaching  in diameter covered the ground, caused significant crop and property damage, killed dozens of animals, and injured multiple people in a large stretch around the tornado and to the northwest of the tornado’s path.

Tornado summary
As the tornado moved northeast, it uprooted multiple oak and beech trees. The tornado intensified into F2-F3 intensity as it threw two children, who survived, into a lake. Continuing northeast, the tornado crossed a lake and was spotted by an eye witness, which described the tornado as a “wedge tornado”. The eye witness also described the water levels rose and then retreated around the time of the tornado. After crossing the lake, the tornado destroyed a home, where the roof was “blown away” and the walls were “blown down”. At this structure is where the only fatality from the tornado occurred.

As the tornado reached its smallest width, still maintaining F3 intensity, a possible twin or satellite waterspout merged with the tornado along the shore of Lake Luzin. Immediately after the merge, the tornado changed direction to almost due north and intensified to F3-F4 intensity as it completely destroyed a beech timber forest. After scouring the ground, the tornado turned northeast, where it completely destroyed Lichtenberg forest. The European Severe Storms Laboratory noted this damage was worse than the previous forestry damage.

The tornado then rapidly intensified as it debarked oak tree at F4 intensity. Shortly after debarking the tree, the tornado reached its peak intensity. A mansion with adjacent dairy farm was completely wiped out except the mansion's ground floor. Oak tree stubs were ripped out of the ground and cobblestones weighing  were thrown. The European Severe Storms Laboratory stated, the “incredible” damage at the mansion warranted the rating of F5/T11 with estimated windspeeds at least . After destroying the mansion, an eye witness saw the tornado and stated it was “surrounded by birds trapped in the vortex”.

The tornado then rapidly intensified as it struck Rothe Kirche. Here, an old oak tree was uprooted, which lifted a skeleton out of a grave at F3 intensity. The tornado then continues northeast, passing just west of Woldegk, where it damaged a mansion, completely destroyed two barns, and overturned seven dung carts at F2-F3 intensity. Further to the northeast, the tornado struck an airborne flock of geese, killing some and injuring 60-100 others. Isolated tree damage was seen around this time as well. The tornado then struck Helpt at F2 intensity, where a mansion and another structure sustained roof damage as well as the upper floor being removed from a gatehouse. After striking Helpt, the tornado dissipated.

See also
 List of F5 and EF5 tornadoes

References

Notes

External links
 

F5 tornadoes
Tornadoes in Germany